Toli तोली is a village in Achham District, Sudurpashchim Province, in the western region of Nepal. At the time of the 1991 Nepal census, the population was 2921 in 499 houses. Only 1% of the villagers were educated at that time because there was only one school (Dhanawantri Prathamik Vidhlaya) with a single teacher. At the time of the 2001 Nepal census, the population was 3441 and around 22% of the population is literate.

It is very hot in the summer and very cold in the winter in this village. There are 9 wards in this village. The main occupation of the villagers is farming, and common foods include chapati and rice. There is no electricity in the village, and the nearest cities are Surkhet, Nepaljung, and Cheesapani.

The predominant caste is Rawal.

References

Populated places in Achham District
Village development committees in Achham District